Čedomir Mijanović (Cyrillic: Чедомир Мијановић; born 17 January 1980) is a Montenegrin retired professional footballer who plays as a defender.

References

External links

 
 
 

1980 births
Living people
Footballers from Nikšić
Association football defenders
Serbia and Montenegro footballers
Montenegrin footballers
FK BASK players
FK Pobeda players
FK Zemun players
Changsha Ginde players
FK Kolubara players
FK Banat Zrenjanin players
FK Srem players
Tuen Mun SA players
Yokohama FC Hong Kong players
Yuen Long FC players
Macedonian First Football League players
First League of Serbia and Montenegro players
Chinese Super League players
Serbian First League players
Serbian SuperLiga players
Hong Kong First Division League players
Hong Kong Premier League players
Serbia and Montenegro expatriate footballers
Expatriate footballers in North Macedonia
Serbia and Montenegro expatriate sportspeople in North Macedonia
Expatriate footballers in China
Serbia and Montenegro expatriate sportspeople in China
Montenegrin expatriate footballers
Expatriate footballers in Serbia
Montenegrin expatriate sportspeople in Serbia
Expatriate footballers in Hong Kong
Montenegrin expatriate sportspeople in Hong Kong